Benoît Lamarche (born 7 July 1966) is a Canadian speed skater. He competed at the 1984 Winter Olympics and the 1988 Winter Olympics.

Ben Lamarche is the father of Pierre Olivier Lamarche, Béatrice Lamarche, and Catherine Lamarche and the older brother of Marie-Pierre Lamarche.

References

External links
 

1966 births
Living people
Canadian male speed skaters
Olympic speed skaters of Canada
Speed skaters at the 1984 Winter Olympics
Speed skaters at the 1988 Winter Olympics
Speed skaters from Quebec City
Academic staff of Université Laval
Laval Rouge et Or athletes
20th-century Canadian people